The 2010–11 Oklahoma Sooners basketball team represents the University of Oklahoma in the 2010–11 NCAA Division I men's basketball season. The Sooners are led by Jeff Capel III in his fifth season. The team plays its home games at the Lloyd Noble Center in Norman, Oklahoma and are members of the Big 12 Conference.

Preseason

Preseason Poll
The Sooners were picked to finish 11th in conference play.

Class of 2010

|}

Roster
Source

Schedule

|-
!colspan=9 style=| Regular Season

|-

|-
! colspan=9 style=|Big 12 tournament

Rankings

References

External links
Official Athletics Site of the Oklahoma Sooners - Men's Basketball

Oklahoma Sooners men's basketball seasons
Oklahoma